Bellevue is a primarily African-American neighborhood on the west side of Macon, Georgia, United States. The area is surrounded by the Weslyan neighborhood to the north-northwest, Vineville to the northeast, Hillcrest to the east, Unionville to the southeast and Bloomfield to the south-southwest The area is served by one elementary school, Brookdale Elementary. 

In recent years, Bellevue has gained a reputation for its steadily increasing crime rate. The area is also the location for Freedom Park, which is also known for its crime rate. Napier Avenue serves as the main route in the area.

References

https://web.archive.org/web/20080914115126/http://www.macon.com/198/story/462625.html
https://archive.today/20130116045255/http://www.13wmaz.com/apps/pbcs.dll/article?AID=200880912011
http://www.13wmaz.com/apps/pbcs.dll/article?AID=200880801009

Geography of Macon, Georgia
Neighborhoods in Georgia (U.S. state)